One justice of the seven-member North Carolina Supreme Court and three judges of the 15-member North Carolina Court of Appeals were elected by North Carolina voters on November 6, 2018, concurrently with other state elections. Terms for seats on each court are eight years. These elections were partisan for the first time since the elections of 2002. A law passed by the North Carolina General Assembly in 2017 cancelled primary elections for judicial elections in 2018 only, meaning that an unlimited number of candidates from any party could run in the general election. 

Democrats won all four races in November 2018, representing an increase of one Democrat on the Supreme Court and an increase of two Democrats on the Court of Appeals (with one Democrat elected to the seat he already held by appointment).

Supreme Court Seat 1 (Jackson seat)
The seat held by Justice Barbara Jackson was on the 2018 ballot.

Candidates
Christopher Anglin (Republican), managing partner at Anglin Law Firm
Anita Earls (Democratic), former executive director of the Southern Coalition for Social Justice, former Deputy Assistant Attorney General for Civil Rights at the U.S. Department of Justice, and former member of the North Carolina State Board of Elections
Barbara Jackson (Republican), incumbent Associate Justice of the Supreme Court of North Carolina

Polling

Results

Court of Appeals Seat 1 (Arrowood seat)
The seat held by Judge John S. Arrowood was on the 2018 ballot. Arrowood was appointed to the seat in 2017 to fill the vacancy caused by the resignation of Judge Douglas McCullough.

Candidates
John S. Arrowood (Democrat), incumbent Judge
Andrew Heath (Republican), North Carolina Superior Court judge and budget director under former Governor of North Carolina Pat McCrory

Results

Court of Appeals Seat 2 (Calabria seat)
The seat held by Judge Ann Marie Calabria, a Republican, was on the 2018 ballot. Calabria did not run for reelection.

Candidates
Jefferson Griffin (Republican), Wake County district court judge
Toby Hampson (Democratic), attorney at Wyrick, Robbins, Yates & Ponton, LLP
Sandra Ray (Republican), New Hanover County district court judge

Results

Court of Appeals Seat 3 (Elmore seat)
The seat held by Judge Rick Elmore, a Republican, was on the 2018 ballot. Elmore announced in 2017 that he would not seek a third term.

Candidates
Allegra Collins (Democratic), law professor at Campbell University School of Law
Chuck Kitchen (Republican), private practice attorney
Michael Monaco (Libertarian), attorney and partner at Monaco & Roberts, PLLC

Results

Notes

References

External links
2018 Judicial Voter Guide from State Board of Elections & Ethics Enforcement

judicial
2018